Edwin A. Raymond (April 11, 1861June 20, 1918) was an American businessman and progressive Republican politician from Green Bay, Wisconsin.  He represented Green Bay in the Wisconsin State Assembly during the 1911–1912 session.

Biography
E. A. Raymond was born in the city of Fond du Lac, Wisconsin, in April 1861.  He was educated in public schools, supplemented by private instruction.  In Fond du Lac, he worked as a clerk in a book and stationary store for seven years.  He then moved to Iron River, Michigan, where he worked as a bookkeeper for the Iron River Furnace Company, and was then employed as an engineer for the Chicago and Northwestern Railway Company for much of the 1880s and 1890s.  He resigned from the railroad in 1898 and operated a wholesale produce business, then purchased a farm in 1901 in Fond du Lac County.  

Finally, in 1906, he moved to Green Bay, Wisconsin, where he worked in the life insurance and real estate businesses.  

In 1910, he ran for Wisconsin State Assembly, seeking the Republican Party nomination.  During this era, the state's politics were largely dominated by the Republican Party, but the party was split between the progressive faction of Robert M. La Follette and the stalwart faction.  Raymond was a supporter of La Follette, and went on to defeat his stalwart opponent  in the primary.

At the general election in November, he narrowly prevailed over Democratic and Social Democratic opponents. His district comprised all of Green Bay as well as the northwest quarter of Brown County.  During the 50th Wisconsin Legislature, he served on the committees on cities, and on labor and labor conditions.

He did not run for re-election in 1912.

Raymond died on the morning of June 20, 1918, after suffering from disease for about a month.

Electoral history

Wisconsin Assembly (1910)

| colspan="6" style="text-align:center;background-color: #e9e9e9;"| Republican Primary, September 6, 1910

| colspan="6" style="text-align:center;background-color: #e9e9e9;"| General Election, November 8, 1910

References

External links
 

1861 births
1918 deaths
Politicians from Fond du Lac, Wisconsin
Politicians from Green Bay, Wisconsin
20th-century American politicians
Republican Party members of the Wisconsin State Assembly